Liu Yuzhang (11 November 1903 – 11 April 1981), nicknamed the "Bald General", was a prominent Chinese (Kuomintang) general. He was one of the very few KMT commanders who could defeat both the Imperial Japanese Army and Communist PLA in the Second Sino-Japanese War and Chinese Civil War, respectively.

Whampoa Military Academy
Liu enrolled in the fourth cadet class in 1925. Some of his well-known classmates included Lin Biao, Hu Lien, and Zhang Lingfu. After graduation, he participated in the Northern Expedition and Central Plains War and was promoted to the commander of the 5th Regiment, the 2nd Division when the Sino-Japan War began.

Second Sino-Japanese War
In fact, Liu had already experienced fighting with Imperial Japanese Army in 1933, during the Defense of the Great Wall, in which he suffered a minor wound. After the war against Japan broke out in 1937, he distinguished himself in the Battle of Taierzhuang, Battle of Wuhan. In 1939, he was promoted to the brigade commander and also the garrison commander of Changsha and fought against Japanese forces in the First Battle of Changsha. In 1941, his commander Guan Linzheng promoted him to the post of the commander of the 2nd Division, the 52nd Army, while the corps stationed in Yunan. In 1945, he led the 2nd Division to Vietnam to accept the surrender of Japanese forces there. When Chinese communist forces invaded Manchuria, Liu's 52nd Army were sent to Manchuria to fight with the communist forces under his former classmate, Lin Biao.

Chinese Civil War

Recovery of Shenyang
In September 1945, the Soviet Red Army of USSR occupied Shenyang. In March 1946, the Red Army withdrew from Shenyang and the KMT took over the city. Soon afterward, the PLA started large offensive operations against Shenyang. Liu was commander of KMT troops, and CPC's commander was Lin Biao, Liu's former classmate who had now become his enemy. Both men were fighting for the control of the city.  Liu defeated Lin Biao's troops and won the battle, recovering Shenyang successfully at last, and after this victory Liu was promoted to lieutenant general. This battle was one of the early engagements  in Manchuria where KMT had initial success.

Refusal to obey Chiang's order
When the Liaoshen Campaign broke out in September 1948, Liu's 52nd Army was part of the 9th Army Group. The 9th Army Group was tasked personally by Chiang Kai-shek to relieve the city of Jinzhou, and both 9th Army Group commander General Liao Yaoxiang and Liu knew that the city was a lost cause, so they suggested to  President Chiang Kai-shek if the relief effort was not successful that the 9th Army Group should withdraw to Yinkou via sea. Chiang and nationalist overall commander in Manchuria, General Wei Lihuang agreed their proposal. But the 9th Army Group failed both objectives and on 26 October,  the Communist Manchurian Field Army captured General Liao and took 100,000 nationalist soldiers as their prisoners.

Yingkou retreat
When CPC won the Liaoshen Campaign, KMT still had 50,000 troops near Yingkou port when CPC began the final siege of the city. Liu's 52nd Army fought in rear guard actions to help those 50,000 men retreat to friendly territories such as Shanghai by sea,

On 31 October 1948 Liu boarded the last KMT naval ship to leave port when communist rocket and mortar fires fell on the beach.  At this point he became extremely emotional and cried because he knew that KMT had lost the whole of Manchuria forever.

Trained in Command and General Staff College
Liu succeed his classmate Hu Lien as commander of Kinmen defense area and was sent to United States to study by Chiang Kai-shek. He was one of the few Chinese generals who graduated from an American military academy besides General Sun Li-jen. He was appointed as garrison commander of Taiwan and head of nationalist security police. Liu retired from the army in 1970 and died in 1981.

Popular culture
In Taiwan, there are two war films about Liu Yuzhang and his units:
7-Man Army
Da Mo Tian Lin (大摩天嶺): the background of this film was Liaoshen Campaign and Liu's troop had defeated Lin Biao in the hill of Da Mo Tian Lin.

References
Ministry of National Defense R.O.C 

1903 births
1981 deaths
National Revolutionary Army generals from Shaanxi
Chinese anti-communists
People of the Northern Expedition
People of the Central Plains War
Chinese people of World War II
People from Xianyang
Non-U.S. alumni of the Command and General Staff College
Whampoa Military Academy alumni
Recipients of the Order of Blue Sky and White Sun
Chinese Civil War refugees
Taiwanese people from Shaanxi